Beware of a Holy Whore is a 1971 West German drama film written and directed by Rainer Werner Fassbinder that features Lou Castel, Eddie Constantine, Hanna Schygulla and Fassbinder himself. Fassbinder considered this to be his favorite of his own films.

While in a hotel with too much drink, drugs and time the cast and crew of a film are gradually unravelling as they await the arrival of their director. Semi-autobiographical, the film was influenced by the shooting of the director's earlier Whity in Spain. The film features music from Leonard Cohen's first album Songs of Leonard Cohen and from Spooky Two by Spooky Tooth, among others.

Plot 

Beware of a Holy Whore opens with a soliloquy (delivered by Werner Schroeter) about the synopsis of a Disney story featuring Goofy, the dog. Goofy cross-dresses in his aunt's clothes to teach a kindergarten class and, after being ridiculed by the class, takes a "poor orphan girl" into his home. The little girl is actually a dwarf gangster, Wee Willy, and he fools Goofy into caring for him by wearing the clothes that Goofy discarded after being ridiculed by the school children. That night Goofy's house is raided by police and Wee Willy is arrested, revealing the "poor orphan girl's" true identity to Goofy. When Willy's true identity is revealed the confused Goofy says, "What a shock that must have been for the poor little girl when she discovered that she is a crook". In both instances—attempting to teach the kindergarten class and caring for Wee Willy—Goofy is beaten by those for whom he only sought to care. This opening soliloquy alludes to the film's underlying themes of violence, self-blindness, and same-sex and bisexual relationships.
The action of the movie then moves to a coastal hotel in Spain where the cast of the film's meta-film "Patria O Muerte" are waiting for production money and the director (Lou Castel) and the star (Eddie Constantine, as himself) to arrive. While waiting for everything the cast engages in sexual intrigues (both same-sex and opposite-sex), slander, and challenging power dynamics amongst themselves. The director then arrives by helicopter and inserts himself in the mix of cast interactions in a draconian manner, flaring the already discordant interactions among the cast. The remainder of the production depicts the mayhem of a movie production wrought with vicissitude and conflicting power dynamics. Fassbinder described the production as “a film about why living and working together as a group doesn’t function, even with people who want it to and for whom the group is life itself”.

Cast 

Lou Castel as Jeff 
Eddie Constantine as himself
Marquard Bohm as Ricky 
Hanna Schygulla as Hanna 
Rainer Werner Fassbinder as Sascha 
Margarethe von Trotta as Babs 
Hannes Fuchs as David
Marcella Michelangeli as Margret
Karl Scheydt as Manfred
Ulli Lommel as Korbinian, manager
Monica Teuber as Billi, makeup artist
Magdalena Montezuma as Irm, Jeff's ex
Werner Schroeter as Deiters
Kurt Raab as Fred

References

External links
 

1971 films
1970s German-language films
1970s avant-garde and experimental films
1971 drama films
Films about drugs
Films about filmmaking
Films directed by Rainer Werner Fassbinder
German avant-garde and experimental films
German drama films
West German films
1970s German films